The Hiram Baldwin House, also known as the Baldwin-Wackerle Residence, is a Frank Lloyd Wright designed Prairie school home located at 205 Essex Road in Kenilworth, Illinois. Built in 1905, the house was part of Wright's primary period of development of the Prairie School. The house has a centrifugal floor plan with a north–south axis and wings containing the living room and stair tower. The exterior is stucco with wood stripping, and the roof is low-pitched, both typical features of the Prairie School. The living room uses its fireplace as a focal point and has curved walls with casement windows. The house's garden space is divided by wooden screens to form courtyards, an element inspired by Japanese architecture. The house is Wright's only residential work in Kenilworth.

The house was added to the National Register of Historic Places on July 28, 1983.

References 

 Storrer, William Allin. The Frank Lloyd Wright Companion. University Of Chicago Press, 2006,  (S.107)

External links 

Photos on Flickr
Baldwin house on delmars.com
Photo of Baldwin house on prairiestyles.com
Baldwin house on peterbeers.net

Frank Lloyd Wright buildings
Houses on the National Register of Historic Places in Cook County, Illinois
Kenilworth, Illinois